Don Elliot Heald (July 7, 1922 in Concord, Massachusetts – February 19, 2009 in Atlanta, Georgia) graduated from University of Florida in 1947 and began his career at WRUF in Gainesville, Florida. He then took a news job at WSB radio and then moved to WSB-TV. Heald considered his 30 years at WSB as the "Golden Age" of television. He helped build WSB into the leading television station of Atlanta. Upon retiring in 1980 he devoted time to the National Cancer Society. He was inducted into the Georgia Broadcasters Hall of Fame in 1997.

Heald was the voice of the National Bureau of Standards atomic clock broadcast on shortwave station WWV from May 1955 until August 13, 1991. He is also credited for being the voice of the Audichron.

References 

1922 births
2009 deaths
Telephone voiceover talent
University of Florida alumni